Renzo Olivo and Horacio Zeballos were the defending champions, but chose not to defend their title.

Facundo Argüello and Roberto Maytín won the title after defeating Aleksandre Metreveli and Dmitry Popko 6–2, 7–5 in the final.

Seeds

Draw

References
 Main Draw

Hoff Open - Doubles
2016